The species problem is the set of questions that arises when biologists attempt to define what a species is. Such a definition is called a species concept; there are at least 26 recognized species concepts. A species concept that works well for sexually reproducing organisms such as birds may be useless for species that reproduce asexually, such as bacteria. The scientific study of the species problem has been called microtaxonomy.

One common, but sometimes difficult, question is how best to decide which species an organism belongs to, because reproductively isolated groups may not be readily recognizable, and cryptic species may be present. There is a continuum from reproductive isolation with no interbreeding, to panmixis, unlimited interbreeding. Populations can move forward or backwards along this continuum, at any point meeting the criteria for one or another species concept, and failing others.

Many of the debates on species touch on philosophical issues, such as nominalism and realism, and on issues of language and cognition.

The current meaning of the phrase "species problem" is quite different from what Charles Darwin and others meant by it during the 19th and early 20th centuries. For Darwin, the species problem was the question of how new species arose. Darwin was however one of the first people to question how well-defined species are, given that they constantly change.

History

Before Darwin 
The idea that an organism reproduces by giving birth to a similar organism, or producing seeds that grow to a similar organism, goes back to the earliest days of farming. While people tended to think of this as a relatively stable process, many thought that change was possible. The term species was just used as a term for a sort or kind of organism, until in 1686 John Ray introduced the biological concept that species were distinguished by always producing the same species, and this was fixed and permanent, though considerable variation was possible within a species. Carolus Linnaeus (1707–1778) formalized the taxonomic rank of species, and devised the two part naming system of binomial nomenclature that we use today. However, this did not prevent disagreements on the best way to identify species.

The history of definitions of the term species reveals that the seeds of the modern species debate were alive and growing long before Darwin. For example, Linnaeus saw species as eternally fixed in his very first publication from 1735, but only a few years later he stated that hybridization was a way that speciation could occur.

From Darwin to Mayr 

Charles Darwin's famous book On the Origin of Species (1859) offered an explanation as to how species evolve, given enough time. Although Darwin did not provide details on how species can split into two, he viewed speciation as a gradual process. If Darwin was correct, then, when new incipient species are forming, there must be a period of time when they are not yet distinct enough to be recognized as species. Darwin's theory suggested that there was often not going to be an objective fact of the matter, on whether there were one or two species.

Darwin's book triggered a crisis of uncertainty for some biologists over the objectivity of species, and some came to wonder whether individual species could be objectively real — i.e. have an existence that is independent of the human observer.

In the 1920s and 1930s, Mendel's theory of inheritance and Darwin's theory of evolution by natural selection were joined in what was called the modern synthesis. This conjunction of theories also had a large impact on how biologists think about species. Edward Poulton anticipated many ideas on species that today are well accepted, and that were later more fully developed by Theodosius Dobzhansky and Ernst Mayr, two of the architects of the modern synthesis. Dobzhansky's 1937 book articulated the genetic processes that occur when incipient species are beginning to diverge. In particular, Dobzhansky described the critical role, for the formation of new species, of the evolution of reproductive isolation.

Mayr's Biological Species Concept 

Ernst Mayr's 1942 book was a turning point for the species problem. In it, he wrote about how different investigators approach species identification, and he characterized their approaches as species concepts. He argued for what came to be called the Biological Species Concept (BSC), that a species consists of populations of organisms that can reproduce with one another and that are reproductively isolated from other populations, though he was not the first to define "species" on the basis of reproductive compatibility. For example, Mayr discusses how Buffon proposed this kind of definition of "species" in 1753.
Theodosius Dobzhansky was a contemporary of Mayr and the author of a classic book about the evolutionary origins of reproductive barriers between species, published a few years before Mayr's. Many biologists credit Dobzhansky and Mayr jointly for emphasizing reproductive isolation.

After Mayr's book, some two dozen species concepts were introduced. Some, such as the Phylogenetic Species Concept (PSC), were designed to be more useful than the BSC for describing species. Many authors have professed to "solve" or "dissolve" the species problem. Some have argued that the species problem is too multidimensional to be "solved" by any one concept. Since the 1990s, others have argued that concepts intended to help describe species have not helped to resolve the species problem. Although Mayr promoted the BSC for use in systematics, some systematists have criticized it as not operational. For others, the BSC is the preferred definition of species. Many geneticists who work on speciation prefer the BSC because it emphasizes the role of reproductive isolation. It has been argued that the BSC is a natural consequence of the effect of sexual reproduction on the dynamics of natural selection.

Philosophical aspects

Realism 

Realism, in the context of the species problem, is the philosophical position that species are real mind-independent entities, natural kinds. Mayr, a proponent of realism, attempted to demonstrate species exist as natural, extra-mental categories. He showed for example that the New Guinean tribesman classify 136 species of birds, which Western ornithologists came to independently recognize:

Mayr's argument however has been criticized:

Another position of realism is that natural kinds are demarcated by the world itself by having a unique property that is shared by all the members of a species, and none outside the group. In other words, a natural kind possesses an essential or intrinsic feature (“essence”) that is self-individuating and non-arbitrary. This notion has been heavily criticized as essentialist, but modern realists have argued that while biological natural kinds have essences, these need not be fixed and are prone to change through speciation. According to Mayr reproductive isolation or interbreeding "supplies an objective yardstick, a completely non-arbitrary criterion” and "describing a presence or absence relationship makes this species concept non-arbitrary". The BSC defines species as "groups of actually or potentially interbreeding natural populations, which are reproductively isolated from other such groups". From this perspective, each species is based on a property (reproductive isolation) that is shared by all the organisms in the species that objectively distinguishes them.

Nominalism

Some philosophical variants of nominalism propose that species are just names that people have assigned to groups of creatures but where the lines between species get drawn does not reflect any fundamental underlying biological cut-off point. In this view, the kinds of things that people have given names to, do not reflect any underlying reality. It then follows that species do not exist outside the mind, because species are just named abstractions. If species are not real, then it would not be sensible to talk about "the origin of a species" or the "evolution of a species". As recently at least as the 1950s, some authors adopted this view and wrote of species as not being real.

A counterpoint to the nominalist views in regard to species, was raised by Michael Ghiselin who argued that an individual species is not a type, but rather an actual individual, an actual entity. This idea comes from thinking of a species as an evolving dynamic population. If viewed as an entity, a species would exist regardless of whether or not people have observed it and whether or not it has been given a name.

Pragmatism

A popular alternative view, pragmatism, espoused by philosophers such as Philip Kitcher and John Dupré states while species do not exist in the sense of natural kinds, they are conceptually real and exist for convenience and for practical applications. For example, regardless of which definition of species one uses, one can still quantitatively compare species diversity across regions or decades, as long as the definition is held constant within a study. This has practical importance in advancing biodiversity science and environmental science.

Language and the role of human investigators

The nominalist critique of the view that kinds of things exist, raises for consideration the role that humans play in the species problem. For example, Haldane suggested that species are just mental abstractions.

Several authors have noted the similarity between "species", as a word of ambiguous meaning, and points made by Wittgenstein on family resemblance concepts and the indeterminacy of language.

Jody Hey described the species problem as a result of two conflicting motivations by biologists:
 to categorize and identify organisms;
 to understand the evolutionary processes that give rise to species.

Under the first view, species appear to us as typical natural kinds, but when biologists turn to understand species evolutionarily they are revealed as changeable and without sharp boundaries. Hey argued that it is unrealistic to expect that one definition of "species" is going to serve the need for categorization and still reflect the changeable realities of evolving species.

Pluralism and monism 

Many approaches to the species problem have attempted to develop one single common conception of what species are and of how they should be identified. It is thought that, if such a monistic description of species could be developed and agreed upon, then the species problem would be solved. In contrast, authors such as the botanist Brent Mishler have argued for pluralism, claiming that biologists cannot have just one shared concept of species, and that they should accept multiple, seemingly incompatible ideas about species. David Hull however argued that pluralist proposals were unlikely to actually solve the species problem.

See also 
 Evolutionarily significant unit (ESU)
 Ring species

References

External links 

 A catalogue of species conceptions
 Curiosities of Biological Nomenclature

Species
Unsolved problems in biology